Sakhisizwe Local Municipality is an administrative area in the Chris Hani District of the Eastern Cape in South Africa. Sakhisizwe is an isiXhosa name meaning "we are building the nation".

Main places
The 2001 census divided the municipality into the following main places:

Politics 

The municipal council consists of seventeen members elected by mixed-member proportional representation. Nine councillors are elected by first-past-the-post voting in nine wards, while the remaining eight are chosen from party lists so that the total number of party representatives is proportional to the number of votes received. In the election of 1 November 2021 the African National Congress (ANC) won a majority of thirteen seats on the council.
The following table shows the results of the election.

References

External links
 http://www.sakhisizwe.gov.za/

Local municipalities of the Chris Hani District Municipality